is a public university in Tagawa, Fukuoka, Japan, established in 1992.

External links
 Official website 

Educational institutions established in 1992
Public universities in Japan
Universities and colleges in Fukuoka Prefecture
1992 establishments in Japan